(born 17 January) is a Japanese manga artist and illustrator, best known for illustrating the Spiral: The Bonds of Reasoning series.

Works

Manga 
 Spiral: The Bonds of Reasoning (story by Kyō Shirodaira)
 Spiral: Alive (story by Kyō Shirodaira)
 Umineko no Naku Koro Ni: Episode 07 - Requiem of the Golden Witch (story by Ryukishi07)
 Otherside Picnic (story by Iori Miyazawa)

Art books 
 Eita Mizuno Art Book: Spiral 
 Eita Mizuno Art Book 2: Spiral All Along
 Eita Mizuno Art Book 3: Spiral Alive

References

External links 
 Official Homepage of Eita Mizuno  
 

Living people
Japanese illustrators
Manga artists
Year of birth missing (living people)